Zawadzki  (feminine: Zawadzka, plural: Zawadzcy) is a Polish and Ukrainian surname. It is a toponymic surname derived from one of the numerous locations named Zawada or Zawady.

It may belong to a noble family bearing the Zawadzki coat of arms.

Historically, due to the instability of the orthography, as well as in the periods of the partitions of Poland by foreign powers the same person or persons of the same family could use different spelling of the surname. Variant spellings include Zawadski, Zavadsky, Zavadski, Zawadowsky, Zawadowski, Sawadsky, Sawadski, Sawatsky, Sawatzky, Zawatzki, etc. 

Notable people with these surnames include:

Zawadzki, Zawadski or Zawacki
 Agnes Zawadzki (born 1994), American figure skater
 Aleksander Zawadzki (disambiguation)
 Andrew Zawacki (born 1972), American poet
 Angelica Zawadzki (born 1952), Mexican sprint canoer
 Anna Zawadzka (1919–2004), Polish author
 Dariusz Zawadzki (born 1982), Polish football player
 Ewa Zawadzka (born 1950), Polish graphic artist
 Gila Golan (born 1940, originally Zosia Zawadzka), model and actress
 Janusz Zawadzki (1931–1977), Polish ice hockey player
 Jolanta Zawadzka (born 1987), Polish chess player
 Józef Zawadzki (disambiguation)
 Lance Zawadzki (born 1985), American baseball player
 Magdalena Zawadzka (born 1944), Polish actress
 Marcelina Zawadzka (born 1989), Polish model
 Saturnin Zawadzki (1923–2003), Polish soil scientist
 Sebastian Zawadzki (born 1991), Polish-born composer and pianist
 Stella Márquez Zawadski or Stella Araneta (born 1937), Colombian pageant director and beauty queen
 Stanisław Zawadzki (1743–1806), Polish architect
 Stanisława Zawadzka (1890–1988), Polish singer
 Stefan Zawadzki (born 1946), Polish historian
 Sylwester Zawadzki (disambiguation)
 Tadeusz Zawadzki (1921–1943), Polish scoutmaster and lieutenant of the Armia Krajowa
 Tavar Zawacki (born 1980), American abstract artist 
 Włodzimierz Zawadzki (born 1967), Polish sport wrestler

Sawatzky, Sawatsky or Sawatzki
This version of the name is very prevalent among the Plautdietsch-speaking Russian Mennonites who emigrated from Ukraine to Canada and the United States. Many hundreds or thousands of families with these spellings exist, thus it is likely the most numerous of the many versions listed in this article. Family history suggests it derives from a Pole who converted to Mennonitism and joined the Mennonites in the Vistula delta region. It is not connected to other similar-sounding German names like the Sudeten-German name Watzke or Watzky, with which it is sometimes confused.

 Andrea Sawatzki (born 1963), German actress
 Darren Sawatzky (born 1973), American soccer player
 George Sawatzky (born 1942), Canadian-Dutch physicist
 Harry Leonard Sawatzky (1931–2008), Canadian scholar and writer
 Herb Sawatzky (1933–1999), Australian rules football player
 John Sawatsky (born 1948), Canadian author and journalist
 Peter Sawatzky (born 1951), Canadian sculptor
 Rick Sawatsky (born 1976), Canadian curler
 Mary Sawatzky (born 1961), American politician
 Michelle Sawatzky-Koop (born 1970), Canadian volleyball player
 Rick Sawatsky (born 1976), Canadian curler

Other variants
 Ed Zawatsky (born 1968), Canadian hockey coach

Fictional characters
Ralph Sawatzky, a protagonist of the 1990 American film Working Trash
Fabian Sawatzki, Look Who's Back/Er ist wieder da 2015 German satirical black comedy film

See also
 
 
 Las Zawadzki, a village in central Poland
 Zawadowski
 Zawada (surname)

Polish-language surnames
Ukrainian-language surnames
Polish toponymic surnames
Russian Mennonite surnames